The 2003 Tour Down Under was the fifth edition of the Tour Down Under stage race. It took place from 21 to 26 January in and around Adelaide, South Australia.

Stage 1
21 January 2003 – Adelaide – Adelaide, 50 km 

Stage and General Classification after Stage 1

Stage 2
22 January 2003 – Jacobs Creek – Kapunda, 140 km 

Stage 2 result

Stage 3
23 January 2003 – Glenelg – Hahndorf, 164 km 

Stage 3 result

Stage 4
24 January 2003 – Unley – Goolwa, 144 km 

Stage 4 result

Stage 5
25 January 2003 – Willunga – Willunga, 147 km 

Stage 5 result

Stage 6
26 January 2003 – Adelaide – Adelaide, 90 km 

Stage 6 result

Final standings

General classification

Points Classification

King of the Mountains classification

Young Riders' classification

References

Tour Down Under
Tour Down Under
Tour Down Under
2003 in Oceanian sport
Tour